Hugo Rivero (born in Montevideo, Uruguay) is a Uruguayan former footballer who played for clubs in Argentina and Chile.

Teams 
  Platense 1968–1970
  San Lorenzo 1971–1972
  Gimnasia y Esgrima de La Plata 1973
  Huachipato 1974–1982

Titles 
  San Lorenzo 1972 (Torneo Metropolitano Primera División Argentina Championship)
  Huachipato 1974 (Chilean Primera División Championship)

References

External links 
 

Living people
Uruguayan footballers
Uruguayan expatriate footballers
Club de Gimnasia y Esgrima La Plata footballers
Club Atlético Platense footballers
San Lorenzo de Almagro footballers
C.D. Huachipato footballers
Argentine Primera División players
Chilean Primera División players
Expatriate footballers in Chile
Expatriate footballers in Argentina
Association football defenders
Year of birth missing (living people)